"The Box and the Bunny" is the second episode from the American dramedy series Ugly Betty, which aired on October 5, 2006. Although this is the second episode overall in the series, it is listed as the third episode on the first season DVD release, while "Queens for a Day" was listed as episode 2. The episode's title is a reference to the music box that Bradford took from Fey's apartment, and Betty's pink stuffed bunny that Amanda kidnaps and abuses. It is also the first episode to be produced in Los Angeles.

Plot
Betty rejoins MODE as Daniel's assistant and he gives her an overview of her official job duties, reminding Betty that they are a team. Daniel then meets with Bradford, who tells Daniel that as the editor-in-chief, he should take charge of "the Book"—the mock-up of the upcoming issue before it hits the stands. Daniel announces to the staff that he will personally review the Book from now on, much to Wilhelmina's displeasure.

The upcoming MODE issue is set to feature movie star Natalie Whitman, who has gained weight from her latest film role. Natalie is dismayed to see how much the MODE editors plan to edit her images, but Wilhelmina claims that fashion is about aspiration, not reality. Natalie asks for Betty's opinion and after a warning look from Daniel, Betty defers to Wilhelmina's opinion. Afterwards, Daniel tells Betty that she needs to follow the opinion of the room, regardless of her true feelings. At the cafeteria, Betty complains to her co-workers about the excessive editing on Natalie's photos, but they shrug it off as part of the business. Natalie stops by their table and partakes in Betty's empanadas, much to the jealousy of the other MODE employees. Back at her desk, Betty notices her pink stuffed bunny is missing from her desk and she begins to receive messages depicting her bunny being destroyed in various ways. Meanwhile, Wilhelmina slips in Natalie's unretouched photos into the Book, confident that Daniel will sign off on the Book without looking at it.

In the evening, Daniel leaves the Book on his desk to go on a date with Amanda. Betty takes it upon herself to take the Book home, where her neighbor Gina Gambaro confronts her, demanding $4,000 to replace the television that Betty broke. Gina notices the Book and steals it from the Suarez household. In the morning, Betty realizes the Book is missing and finds Gina's ransom note. She and Hilda attempt to steal the Book back from Gina, but fail. Daniel calls Betty to check on the Book and sends a town car to pick her up. Betty compliments him on deciding to keep Natalie's unretouched photos and Daniel realizes that Wilhelmina is trying to sabotage him. En route to Mode, Betty calls Christina to fret about how to get the Book back. The chauffeur overhears her conversation and texts Wilhelmina, who sends Marc to pick up the Book from Gina.

At Mode, Betty confesses how she lost the Book and Daniel angrily reminds her that they cannot keep secrets from each other. They return to Queens to get the Book from Gina, who informs them that she already gave it to someone else, though she admits she would have not have done so after getting a chance to admire Daniel. Betty sees Walter installing Gina's new TV set and he assures Betty that he still has feelings for her. On TV, they see a report from Fashion TV about Natalie's unretouched photos. Defeated, Betty and Daniel return to Mode and she suggests that he tell the truth. Daniel admits what happened to Bradford, who is impressed with Daniel's honesty. However, Natalie's publicist is furious about the public learning Natalie still has not lost weight.

In the elevator, Betty runs into Natalie. She tells Natalie that while the fashion industry may consider Natalie to be ugly, regular women wish they could look like her. This inspires Natalie and she announces to the MODE editors that she wants her unretouched photos to be kept in the magazine and for Betty to keep her job. Natalie makes the official announcement on Fashion TV, saving MODE from embarrassment. Wilhelmina pretends that the Book was returned by an anonymous source and Daniel finally reviews the Book before the issue is published. Betty's stuffed bunny is finally returned to her by Amanda, who admits to being the thief. Betty informs Amanda that while her bunny may be worse for wear, it and Betty are not going anywhere.

Meanwhile, Bradford meets with Steve, a private detective who tells him when Fey Sommers' estate sale will be held. Steve offers to break into Fey's apartment in order to remove incriminating evidence on Bradford's behalf. Bradford declines in favor of doing it himself. In Fey's apartment, he steals a music box and burns a photo of himself with Fey. The mysterious masked woman calls Daniel and warns him to be careful around Bradford.

Other notes
Bradford is reading the German newspaper Berliner Zeitung (actually the July 21, 2006 edition of the German newspaper Frankfurter Allgemeine Zeitung with a fake Berliner Zeitung masthead) while talking to his private investigator, Steve, in the park.

In one scene Justin, mentions The Devil Wears Prada, which has been compared to Ugly Betty.

Ratings
The episode would pull in 14.2 million viewers (down from 16.1 million for the first episode) in the United States, making it the second most watched episode in the series

References

Also starring
Kevin Sussman - Walter
Ava Gaudet - Gina Gambarro
Stelio Savante - Steve
Elizabeth Payne - Masked Woman
Cicily Daniels - Zelda

Guest stars
Sarah Jones - Natalie Whitman
Jack Plotnick - Natalie's Publicist
Lucy Davis - Fashion TV Host
Corinne Dekker - Nancy
Jeff Ellingson - Jeff
Michael Edward Rose - Edgar
Scottie Thompson - Photo Editor

Ugly Betty (season 1) episodes
2006 American television episodes